This is a list of all freight railroad (not streetcar or rapid transit) lines that have been built in Massachusetts, and does not deal with ownership changes from one company to another. The lines are named by the first company to build or consolidate them.

B&A lines and related railroads
These railroads were owned by or closely related to the Boston and Albany Railroad, later part of the New York Central Railroad.

B&M lines and related railroads
These railroads were owned by or closely related to the Boston and Maine Railroad.

Connecticut River Division
The Connecticut River Division was the former Connecticut River Railroad.

Eastern Division
The Eastern Division was the former Eastern Railroad.

Fitchburg Division
The Fitchburg Division was the former Fitchburg Railroad.

Southern Division
The Southern Division was the former Boston and Lowell Railroad.

Western Division
The Western Division was the original Boston and Maine Railroad.

Worcester, Nashua and Portland Division
The Worcester, Nashua and Portland Division was the former Worcester, Nashua and Rochester Railroad.

Central Vermont lines and related railroads
These railroads were owned by or closely related to the Central Vermont Railroad.

NYNH&H lines and related railroads
These railroads were owned by or closely related to the New York, New Haven and Hartford Railroad.

Berkshire Division
The Berkshire Division was the former Berkshire Railroad.

Central New England Division
The Central New England Division was the former Central New England Railway.

Hartford Division
The Hartford Division was the former Hartford and New Haven Railroad.

Midland Division
The Midland Division was the former New England Railroad.

Northampton Division
The Northampton Division was the former New Haven and Northampton Company.

Old Colony Division
The Old Colony Division was the former Old Colony Railroad.

Providence and Worcester Division
The Providence and Worcester Division was the former Providence and Worcester Railroad.

Other railroads

See also
List of Massachusetts railroads

References
Railroad History Database
Massachusetts Railroads 1826-1850

 
Railroad lines
Massa